Bridouxia giraudi is a species of tropical freshwater snail with a gill and an operculum, an aquatic gastropod mollusk in the family Paludomidae. 

Bridouxia giraudi is the type species of the genus Bridouxia.

This species is found in Burundi, the Democratic Republic of the Congo, Tanzania, and Zambia. Its natural habitat is freshwater lakes.

References

 Bourguignat, J. R., 1888 Iconographie malacologique des animaux mollusques fluviatiles du lac Tanganika, p. 82 pp
 Brown, D. S. (1980). Freshwater snails of Africa and their medical importance. Taylor & Francis, London. 1-487

External links
 Bourguignat, J.-R. (1885). Notice prodromique sur les mollusques terrestres et fluviatiles recueillis par M. Victor Giraud dans la région méridionale du lac Tanganyika. 110 pp. Paris

Paludomidae
Gastropods described in 1885
Taxonomy articles created by Polbot
Taxa named by Jules René Bourguignat